Summerton High School, also known as Summerton Middle School, is a historic school building located at Summerton, Clarendon County, South Carolina. It was built in 1936, and is a one-story hip roofed, rectangular brick building.  It has a central pavilion featuring a pedimented gable, supported by four cast stone plasters.  Summerton High School is the only school still standing of the five schools in Clarendon County School District #22 that were associated with Briggs v. Elliott, the South Carolina case which was one of the cases consolidated with Brown v. Board of Education. As of 2022 the building is used as administrative offices for Clarendon County School District #1.

It was listed in the National Register of Historic Places in 1994. In 2022 it and the former Scott’s Branch High School were designated part of Brown v. Board of Education National Historical Park.

References

Anti-black racism in the United States
School buildings on the National Register of Historic Places in South Carolina
School buildings completed in 1936
Buildings and structures in Clarendon County, South Carolina
National Register of Historic Places in Clarendon County, South Carolina